Wadi Bih, alternatively Wādī Al-Bayḥ, is a river/wadi that crosses the North-Western Hajar Mountains from the United Arab Emirates, and traversing Oman before returning to the UAE. From the West to the East, it originates in Ras Al Khaimah on the Gulf, before crossing the Omani exclave at the tip of the Musandam Peninsula, past the village of Zighi and into Fujairah at Dibba Al-Hisn, on the Gulf of Oman. The wadi is a popular location for birdwatchers.

Access to Wadi Bih requires a GCC or Omani passport. Residents of the UAE and Oman holding other passports may find access restricted or blocked.

Wadi Bih Run 
The popular Wadi Bih  ultramarathon takes place each year on the Musandam Peninsula in Oman on the first weekend of February. The 72-km solo event is an out and back course, starting at Dibba and climbing 36km into mountainous terrain before the turnaround, taking some five hours to complete. It was founded in 1993.

Gallery

See also 
 List of wadis of the United Arab Emirates

References

External links 
 2017 - Wadi Bih Hike, UAE (YouTube)
 Grand Canyon Wadi Bih mountains Ras Al Khaimah UAE

Rivers of the United Arab Emirates
Musandam Peninsula
Bih